Kneebone may refer to:

 the patella

It may also refer to:

 Harry Kneebone, politician
 Nova Peris-Kneebone, Australian athlete
 Rachel Kneebone, artist
 Roger Kneebone, surgeon
 Ron Kneebone, Australian Rules footballer
 Tom Kneebone, actor and playwright

See also

 Mr Kneebone, EP by Powderfinger
 Mr. Kneebone's New Digs, book by Ian Wallace (illustrator)